is a former Japanese football player.

Club statistics

References

External links

j-league

1982 births
Living people
Ritsumeikan University alumni
Association football people from Kyoto Prefecture
Japanese footballers
J2 League players
Japan Football League players
SP Kyoto FC players
Kataller Toyama players
Kamatamare Sanuki players
Association football forwards